Erin Renee McCorkle (born August 9, 1977) is an American former professional soccer player. A combative defensive midfielder, she played for Carolina Courage of Women's United Soccer Association (WUSA).

Baxter played college soccer for the University of Florida "Gators". She was inducted to the University of Florida Athletic Hall of Fame in April 2009.

Baxter was the Carolina Courage's fourth draft pick ahead of the inaugural 2001 season of the Women's United Soccer Association (WUSA). Described as a "tireless blue-collar worker", versatile Baxter featured as one of the best defensive midfielder in 2001 before switching to central defense in the Courage's 2002 WUSA Founders Cup-winning campaign. When starting midfielder Hege Riise suffered a knee injury early in 2003, Baxter was moved back into midfield.

Following the demise of WUSA, Baxter retrained as an accountant and began working for Ernst & Young in her native Littleton, Colorado. In 2009 she was living with husband John, with whom she has two kids, daughters Kylie Grace and Sydney Harper.

References

External links
 Profile at Women's United Soccer Association
 Profile at Florida Gators

Living people
1977 births
American women's soccer players
Women's United Soccer Association players
Soccer players from Colorado
Carolina Courage players
Women's association football defenders
Women's association football midfielders
Florida Gators women's soccer players
Sportspeople from Littleton, Colorado